Zhou Ren (5 August 1892–3 December 1973) was a Chinese materials engineer and metallurgist. He was an educator and one of the founders of the Science Society of China, a major science organization in the 20th century before the establishment of the Communist State.

He was an academician of the Academia Sinica and the Chinese Academy of Sciences. He was also a delegate to the 1st, 2nd and 3rd National People's Congress.

Biography

Early life and education
Zhou was born in Jiangning County, Jiangsu, on August 5, 1892. After graduating from the Jiangnan Higher School, he arrived in the United States in 1910 at the age of 18 to begin his education at Cornell University in Ithaca, New York.

Republic of China
He returned to China after graduation and worked as an engineer in a construction company under the recommendation of Shi Liangcai, the chief editor of Shen Bao. He was a professor of Nanjing Higher Normal School from 1917 to 1979. In 1919 he was hired as the chief engineer of Sichuan Steelmaking Plant, serving until 1921. In 1922, he moved to Shanghai as dean of National Chiao Tung University, he remained there until 1927. After a short period (1927–1928) of teaching students at National Central University, he went to the Academia Sinica, where he served as director of Institute of Engineering. Zhou  was elected a fellow of the Academia Sinica in 1948.

People's Republic of China
Zhou remained in China after the defeat of the Nationalists over the Communists in the Chinese Civil War. After the founding of the Communist State, Zhou successively served as president of Laboratory of Engineering Experiment of Chinese Academy of Sciences (CAS), Institute of Metallurgy and Ceramics of CAS, Shanghai Metallurgy Institute, Shanghai Institute of Silicate Chemistry and Engineering, and Shanghai University of Science and Technology. He became an academician of the Chinese Academy of Sciences in 1955.

In 1966, Mao Zedong launched the ten-year Cultural Revolution, Zhou suffered political persecution in the massive socialist movement, the Red Guards searched his house and confiscated his property. They put Zhou in isolation and under investigation, where he was mistreated and tortured. Zhou died on December 3, 1973, aged 82.

Personal life
Zhou married Nie Qibi (1901–1990), the youngest daughter of Nie Jigui (1855–1911), an official and the son-in-law of Qing dynasty statesman, military general, and Confucian scholar Zeng Guofan (1811–1872). The couple had two sons and a daughter.

Zhou's elder sister Zhou Jun was the third wife of Cai Yuanpei, an exceptional educator, esperantist, president of Peking University, and founder of the Academia Sinica.

References

1892 births
1973 deaths
Chinese metallurgists
Cornell University alumni
Educators from Nanjing
Engineers from Jiangsu
Members of Academia Sinica
Members of the Chinese Academy of Sciences
Scientists from Nanjing
Victims of the Cultural Revolution